KCAP (950 AM) is a radio station licensed to serve Helena, Montana. The station is owned by Kevin Terry, through licensee The Montana Radio Company, LLC.  It airs a news/talk format.

The station went on the air November 1, 1976 as KMTX. Until 2014, the station broadcast an adult standards format as "Classy 950." In October 2014, Cherry Creek Radio announced that it would purchase KMTX from The Montana Radio Company and move its news/talk programming to KMTX from the original KCAP (1340 AM) and KBLL (1240 AM); those stations went off the air on November 5, the date that KMTX changed formats. The station was assigned the KCAP call letters by the Federal Communications Commission on November 6. Cherry Creek Radio's purchase of KCAP and translator K240EM was consummated on November 12, 2015, at a price of $250,004.

On April 5, 2017, Montana Radio Company announced that it would acquire Cherry Creek Media's Helena stations KCAP, KZMT, and KBLL-FM. To comply with ownership limits, KKRK's license will be divested to Yellowstone Public Radio, and KKRK's format and programming will be re-located. The purchase was consummated on July 28, 2017.

Awards
In June 2007, Paul Stark of KMTX was presented an E.B. Craney Broadcasting Award for excellence in Radio Station Promotion at the annual meeting of the Montana Broadcasters Association. Kevin Skaalure of KTMX won a Craney for best Radio Public Service Campaign at the same ceremony.

References

External links

CAP
News and talk radio stations in the United States
Radio stations established in 1976
1976 establishments in Montana